Germán Ramírez Ureña (born August 26, 1995, in Tijuana, Baja California) is a Mexican professional footballer who plays for Club Tijuana.

References

External links
 
 
 Germán Ramírez Urenda at Isidro Metapan

Living people
1995 births
Mexican footballers
Mexican expatriate footballers
Association football midfielders
Lobos BUAP footballers
Pioneros de Cancún footballers
A.D. Isidro Metapán footballers
Ascenso MX players
Liga Premier de México players
Mexican expatriate sportspeople in El Salvador
Expatriate footballers in El Salvador
Sportspeople from Tijuana
Footballers from Baja California